Abercraf English (also known as Abercrave English) is a dialect of Welsh English, primarily spoken in the village of Abercraf, located in the far south of the traditional county of Brecknockshire, currently administered as part of the unitary authority of Powys.

Accent
Abercraf English is distinct from most other accents in its county due to separation by the Brecon Beacons, creating a substantial communication barrier between the localities. It is more appropriate to associate it with neighbouring Swansea Valley, particularly the speech in northern areas (esp. Ystalyfera) since they are more similar to Abercraf than ones in most of its county, excepting Ystradgynlais. This could be seen from a survey where speakers could not discern the origins of the speech of Ystradgynlais and their hometown, but were able to discern Cwmtwrch with other villages in the valley.

History 
Abercraf was entirely Welsh-speaking until World War II, when English-speaking evacuees settled in the village. It is a relatively young acquired dialect. This can be seen from generally less assimilation and elision and clear articulation unlike other accents in Brecknockshire or Glamorgan. Being a more modern accent causes it to be restricted to the last two to three generations, with younger people being much more likely to speak it; although a lot of their daily lives is conducted in Welsh, thus causing English to be taught as a second language.

Phonology

Consonants
Like many other accents in Britain, Abercraf's consonants generally follow that of Received Pronunciation, although it does have some unique innovations common for South Wales dialects:
 As in Port Talbot, consonants can be geminated by any preceding vowel except long non-close vowels, and is most noticeable in fortis plosives and when they are in intervocalic positions.
  is regularly a tapped .
 Marginal loan consonants from Welsh  may be used for Welsh proper nouns and expressions, yet  is often heard in the discourse particle right.
 The -es morphemic suffix in words like goes, tomatoes is often voiceless  instead of  found elsewhere.
 H-dropping is quite common in informal speech, although  is pronounced in emphatic speech and while reading word lists.
  is always clear, likewise there is no vowel breaking.

Vowels
Abercraf English is non-rhotic;  is only pronounced before a vowel. Like RP, linking and intrusive R is present in the system. On the other hand, the vowel system varies greatly from RP, unlike its consonants, which is stable in many English accents around the world.

Monophthongs

 The  vowel is always tense, being analysed as the  vowel, where conservative RP has the lax .
  is unrounded and mid . Unlike accents in West Glamorgan which have a rounded , Abercraf's realisation is identical to RP; a similar articulation had also been recorded in Myddfai.
It is transcribed as  because the stressed allophone is close to RP .
 Like all accents of Wales, the –, – and – sets are based more on length rather than vowel quality; creating minimal pairs such as shared–shed, heart–hat and short–shot.
 The – vowels are close to cardinal .
In the case of the former, its articulation is considerably more open than the corresponding RP vowel.
 Pairs – are relatively centralised, although  may approach to the front.
 The trap–bath split is completely absent in Abercraf English unlike other Welsh accents which have lexical exceptions.

Diphthongs

The offsets of the fronting diphthongs are near-close , whereas the offsets of the backing diphthongs are close .
 There are no minimal pairs between  words such as aye/I and Dai/Di, unlike in Port Talbot.
  has a near-open onset , sharing a similar vowel quality as Myddfai, which is also more open than  that of West Glamorgan.

Abercraf has kept some distinctions between diphthong–monophthong pronunciations; they are shared among other south Welsh dialects such as Port Talbot. These distinctions are lost in most other dialects and they include:
 The sequence  is pronounced as  when  is represented in the spelling, otherwise , as in you/youth as opposed to use/ewe. When unstressed and after non-coronal consonants,  uses the  vowel instead.
The diphthongal pronunciations have less movement compared to other south Welsh accents, with the onsets of each evidently being close-mid. Exceptions to this rule also exist similar to Port Talbot English, but  is slightly different in Abercraf:
 The monophthong is generally used before nasals and in the sequence , therefore strange and patience is pronounced .
 Certain minimal pairs that are not distinct in Port Talbot English, but are in Abercraf, such as waste/waist. In Port Talbot these two are pronounced monophthongally.
 Like Port Talbot English,  has a monosyllabic pronunciation  word-initially, including after dropped , making hear, here, year and ear all homophones. Likewise, heard also has this vowel.

Phonemic incidence
Abercraf English generally follows West Glamorgan lexical incidence patterns.

 Only one syllable is in co-op,  being homophonous to cop.
 Haulier has the  vowel unlike other accents which have .
 Unstressed to regularly has  over  even before consonants.
 Want has the  vowel, although this pronunciation was known among non-Welsh speakers of English.
 The vowel in whole uses  instead of the usual .

Assimilation and elision
As mentioned above, there is less assimilation and elision than in other accents, however some consonants can be elided:

 Unlike other colloquial accents in Britain, elision alveolar plosives  before consonants is not common.  was elided in first job and next week but not in soft wood, on the other hand  is rarely elided in binds and old boy and clearly rendered in could be, headmaster and standard one.
  is retracted to  before another  as in bus shelter but not before palatal  in this year (see yod-coalescence).

The vowel  is not elided, thus factory, mandarin, reference always have three syllables, unlike many accents such as RP or even Port Talbot.

Intonation
Abercraf English is considered to have a 'sing-song' or 'lilting' intonation due to having high amount of pitch on an unstressed post-tonic syllable, as well as pre-tonic syllables having a great degree of freedom, with a continuous rising pitch being common.

Grammar

Vocabulary

References

Bibliography

 
 
 

Welsh English
Languages of Wales
Welsh English
Dialects of English
Powys